Christopher Bertolini is a film writer and producer who is known for writing screenplays for films such as The General's Daughter and Battle: Los Angeles.

Personal life
Bertolini has two children, a daughter named Georgia, born on December 20, 1989, and a son, Joey, born in August 1991.

Filmography

References

External links

Living people
20th-century male writers
21st-century American male writers
American film producers
American male screenwriters
Year of birth missing (living people)
21st-century American screenwriters